Torshab (also Romanized as Torshāb; also known as Torshāb-e ‘Olyā) is a village in Heshmatabad Rural District, in the Central District of Dorud County, Lorestan Province, Iran. At the 2006 census, its population was 1,038, in 232 families.

References 

Towns and villages in Dorud County